Alejandro Christoph Duarte Preuss (born 5 April 1994) is a professional footballer who plays as a goalkeeper for Sporting Cristal. Born in Germany, he is a former youth international for Peru.

Career
Duarte is a product of the youth academies of Academia Frama, Esther Grande, Bayer Leverkusen, and Juan Aurich. He began his senior career with Juan Aurich in 2013, before moving to Cienciano in 2015. The following season, he had a stint with Deportivo Municipal. He moved to Mexico in 2017 with USMP, and his success there led to a move to BUAP where he acted as backup goalkeeper. In 2019, he returned to Peru with Zacatepec, before moving to Paraguay the following season with Sportivo Luqueño. He once more returned to Peru in 2021, signing with Sporting Cristal.

International career
Duarte was born in Germany and is of Peruvian descent, and moved to Peru at a young age. He played for the Peru U17s at the 2011 South American U-17 Championship. He was first called up to the senior Peru national team in March 2018.

Honours
Sporting Cristal
Copa Bicentenario: 2021

References

External links
 
 
 
 Alejandro Duarte at Bild

1994 births
Living people
Footballers from Munich
Peruvian footballers
Peru youth international footballers
German footballers
Peruvian people of German descent
German people of Peruvian descent
Peruvian Primera División players
Liga MX players
Ascenso MX players
Paraguayan Primera División players
Juan Aurich footballers
Cienciano footballers
Deportivo Municipal footballers
Club Deportivo Universidad de San Martín de Porres players
Lobos BUAP footballers
Club Atlético Zacatepec players
Sportivo Luqueño players
Sporting Cristal footballers
Association football goalkeepers
Peruvian expatriate footballers
German expatriate footballers
Peruvian expatriate sportspeople in Mexico
German expatriate sportspeople in Mexico
Peruvian expatriate sportspeople in Paraguay
German expatriates in Paraguay
Expatriate footballers in Mexico
Expatriate footballers in Paraguay